Cemil Mengi (born 30 September 1986 in West Berlin) is a Turkish footballer who plays for CFC Hertha 06.

Mengi came through the ranks of Türkiyemspor Berlin as a youth player before moving to Turkey where he made 4 appearances for Çaykur Rizespor in the Süper Lig. As of 2012, the attacking midfielder is playing for BFC Viktoria 1889.

References

External links 
 
 

1986 births
Living people
German people of Turkish descent
Footballers from Berlin
Turkish footballers
Association football midfielders
Süper Lig players
Türkiyemspor Berlin players
Çaykur Rizespor footballers
Turgutluspor footballers
Pazarspor footballers
Tennis Borussia Berlin players